The Pterygometopidae are a family of trilobites, that is known from the Floian to the Katian (Ordovician), and reappears from the Telychian to the Sheinwoodian (Silurian). As part of the Phacopina suborder, its members have schizochroal eyes.

Distribution 
The Pterygometopinae may be exclusive to Baltica and are known from the Floian to the Upper Katian with 49 species in 14 genera. The 71 species from 8 genera belonging to the Eomonorachinae occur mostly in Laurentia from the Floian. One genus, Podowrinella, is known from the Silurian, and may be the sister taxon of the Phacopidae. 50 species in 8 genera have been assigned to the Chasmopinae. They are exclusive to Baltica from the Darriwilian to the Sandbian. The subfamily spread to Avalonia and Laurentia in the Katian, at the end of which they became extinct. 32 species of Monorachinae in 6 genera occurred on the paleocontinent Siberia, now parts of northeastern Russia and of Alaska, from the Sandbian to the Upper Katian.

Genera 
The following genera are assigned to the Pterygometopidae:

Achatella
Bolbochasmops
Calliops
Calyptaulax
Carinopyge
Ceratevenkaspis
Chasmops
Denella
Elasmaspis
Eomonorachus
Estoniops
Evenkaspis
Ingriops
Isalaux
Isalauxina
Keilapyge
Liocnemis
Monorakos
Oculichasmops
Oelandiops
Parevenkaspis
Podowrinella
Pterygometopus
Rollmops
Ruegenometopus
Sceptaspis
Schmidtops
Scopelochasmops
Toxochasmops
Tricopelta
Truncatometopus
Upplandiops
Uralops
Valdariops
Vironiaspis
Volkops
Yanhaoia

References

 
Trilobite families
Phacopoidea
Early Ordovician first appearances
Silurian extinctions